Melatonin is a natural compound, specifically an indoleamine, produced by and found in different organisms including bacteria and eukaryotes. It was discovered by Aaron B. Lerner and colleagues in 1958 as a substance of the pineal gland from cow that could induce skin lightening in common frogs. It was subsequently discovered as a hormone released in the brain at night and that controls of the sleep–wake cycle in vertebrates.

In vertebrates, melatonin is involved in synchronizing circadian rhythms, including sleep–wake timing and blood pressure regulation, and in control of seasonal rhythmicity including reproduction, fattening, moulting and hibernation. Many of its effects are through activation of the melatonin receptors, while others are due to its role as an antioxidant. Its primary function is to defend against oxidative stress in plants and bacteria. Mitochondria are the main cell organelles that produce the antioxidant melatonin, which indicates that melatonin is an "ancient molecule" that primary provided the earliest cells protection from the destructive actions of oxygen.

In addition to its role as a natural hormone and antioxidant, melatonin is used as a dietary supplement and medication in the treatment of sleep disorders such as insomnia and circadian rhythm sleep disorders.

Biological activity
In humans, melatonin is a full agonist of melatonin receptor 1 (picomolar binding affinity) and melatonin receptor 2 (nanomolar binding affinity), both of which belong to the class of G-protein coupled receptors (GPCRs). Melatonin receptors 1 and 2 are both Gi/o-coupled GPCRs, although melatonin receptor 1 is also Gq-coupled. Melatonin also acts as a high-capacity free radical scavenger within mitochondria which also promotes the expression of antioxidant enzymes such as superoxide dismutase, glutathione peroxidase, glutathione reductase, and catalase via signal transduction through melatonin receptors.

Biological functions

Circadian rhythm
In animals, melatonin plays an important role in the regulation of sleep–wake cycles. Human infants' melatonin levels become regular in about the third month after birth, with the highest levels measured between midnight and 8:00 am. Human melatonin production decreases as a person ages. Also, as children become teenagers, the nightly schedule of melatonin release is delayed, leading to later sleeping and waking times.

Antioxidant
Melatonin was first reported as a potent antioxidant and free radical scavenger in 1993. In vitro, melatonin acts as a direct scavenger of oxygen radicals including OH•, O2−•, and the reactive nitrogen species NO•. In plants, melatonin works with other antioxidants to improve the overall effectiveness of each antioxidant. Melatonin has been proven to be twice as active as vitamin E, believed to be the most effective lipophilic antioxidant. Via signal transduction through melatonin receptors, melatonin promotes the expression of antioxidant enzymes such as superoxide dismutase, glutathione peroxidase, glutathione reductase, and catalase.

Melatonin occurs at high concentrations within mitochondrial fluid which greatly exceed the plasma concentration of melatonin. Due to its capacity for free radical scavenging, indirect effects on the expression of antioxidant enzymes, and its significant concentrations within mitochondria, a number of authors have indicated that melatonin has an important physiological function as a mitochondrial antioxidant.

The melatonin metabolites produced via the reaction of melatonin with reactive oxygen species or reactive nitrogen species also react with and reduce free radicals. Melatonin metabolites generated from redox reactions include cyclic 3-hydroxymelatonin, N1-acetyl-N2-formyl-5-methoxykynuramine (AFMK), and N1-acetyl-5-methoxykynuramine (AMK).

Immune system
While it is known that melatonin interacts with the immune system, the details of those interactions are unclear. An anti-inflammatory effect seems to be the most relevant. There have been few trials designed to judge the effectiveness of melatonin in disease treatment. Most existing data are based on small, incomplete trials. Any positive immunological effect is thought to be the result of melatonin acting on high-affinity receptors (MT1 and MT2) expressed in immunocompetent cells. In preclinical studies, melatonin may enhance cytokine production and stimulate T cell expansion, and by doing this, counteract acquired immunodeficiences.

Weight regulation 
A possible mechanism by which melatonin may regulate weight gain is through its inhibitory effect on leptin. Leptin acts as a long-term indicator of energy status in the human body. By suppressing leptin's actions outside of waking hours, melatonin may help restore leptin sensitivity during the daytime by alleviating leptin resistance.

Biochemistry

Biosynthesis

In animals, biosynthesis of melatonin occurs through hydroxylation, decarboxylation, acetylation and a methylation starting with L-tryptophan. L-tryptophan is produced in the shikimate pathway from chorismate or is acquired from protein catabolism. First L-tryptophan is hydroxylated on the indole ring by tryptophan hydroxylase to produce 5-hydroxytryptophan. This intermediate (5-HTP) is decarboxylated by pyridoxal phosphate and 5-hydroxytryptophan decarboxylase to produce serotonin.

Serotonin is itself an important neurotransmitter, but is also converted into N-acetylserotonin by serotonin N-acetyltransferase with acetyl-CoA. Hydroxyindole O-methyltransferase and S-adenosyl methionine convert N-acetylserotonin into melatonin through methylation of the hydroxyl group.

In bacteria, protists, fungi, and plants, melatonin is synthesized indirectly with tryptophan as an intermediate product of the shikimate pathway. In these cells, synthesis starts with D-erythrose 4-phosphate and phosphoenolpyruvate, and in photosynthetic cells with carbon dioxide. The rest of the synthesizing reactions are similar, but with slight variations in the last two enzymes.

It has been hypothesized that melatonin is made in the mitochondria and chloroplasts.

Mechanism 

In order to hydroxylate L-tryptophan, the cofactor tetrahydrobiopterin (THB) must first react with oxygen and the active site iron of tryptophan hydroxylase. This mechanism is not well understood, but two mechanisms have been proposed:

1. A slow transfer of one electron from the THB to O2 could produce a superoxide which could recombine with the THB radical to give 4a-peroxypterin. 4a-peroxypterin could then react with the active site iron (II) to form an iron-peroxypterin intermediate or directly transfer an oxygen atom to the iron.

2. O2 could react with the active site iron (II) first, producing iron (III) superoxide which could then react with the THB to form an iron-peroxypterin intermediate.

Iron (IV) oxide from the iron-peroxypterin intermediate is selectively attacked by a double bond to give a carbocation at the C5 position of the indole ring. A 1.2-shift of the hydrogen and then a loss of one of the two hydrogen atoms on C5 reestablishes aromaticity to furnish 5-hydroxy-L-tryptophan.

A decarboxylase with cofactor pyridoxal phosphate (PLP) removes CO2 from 5-hydroxy-L-tryptophan to produce 5-hydroxytryptamine. PLP forms an imine with the amino acid derivative. The amine on the pyridine is protonated and acts as an electron sink, enabling the breaking of the C-C bond and releasing CO2. Protonation of the amine from tryptophan restores the aromaticity of the pyridine ring and then imine is hydrolyzed to produce 5-hydroxytryptamine and PLP.

It has been proposed that histidine residue His122 of serotonin N-acetyl transferase is the catalytic residue that deprotonates the primary amine of 5-hydroxytryptamine, which allows the lone pair on the amine to attack acetyl-CoA, forming a tetrahedral intermediate. The thiol from coenzyme A serves as a good leaving group when attacked by a general base to give N-acetylserotonin.

N-Acetylserotonin is methylated at the hydroxyl position by S-adenosyl methionine (SAM) to produce S-adenosyl homocysteine (SAH) and melatonin.

Regulation 
In vertebrates, melatonin secretion is regulated by activation of the beta-1 adrenergic receptor by norepinephrine. Norepinephrine elevates the intracellular cAMP concentration via beta-adrenergic receptors and activates the cAMP-dependent protein kinase A (PKA). PKA phosphorylates the penultimate enzyme, the arylalkylamine N-acetyltransferase (AANAT). On exposure to (day)light, noradrenergic stimulation stops and the protein is immediately destroyed by proteasomal proteolysis. Production of melatonin is again started in the evening at the point called the dim-light melatonin onset.

Until recent history, humans in temperate climates were exposed to few hours of (blue) daylight in the winter; their fires gave predominantly yellow light. The incandescent light bulb widely used in the 20th century produced relatively little blue light. Light containing only wavelengths greater than 530 nm does not suppress melatonin in bright-light conditions. Wearing glasses that block blue light in the hours before bedtime may decrease melatonin loss. Use of blue-blocking goggles the last hours before bedtime has also been advised for people who need to adjust to an earlier bedtime, as melatonin promotes sleepiness.

Metabolism
Melatonin has an elimination half-life of 20 to 50minutes. In humans, melatonin is mainly metabolized to 6-hydroxymelatonin, which is conjugated with sulfate to be excreted as a waste product in urine.

Measurement
For research as well as clinical purposes, melatonin concentration in humans can be measured either from the saliva or blood plasma.

Use as a medication and supplement

Melatonin is used as a prescription medication and over-the-counter dietary supplement in the treatment of sleep disorders such as insomnia and circadian rhythm sleep disorders like delayed sleep phase disorder, jet lag disorder, and shift work disorder. Besides melatonin, certain synthetic melatonin receptor agonists like ramelteon, tasimelteon, and agomelatine are also used in medicine.

History
Melatonin was first discovered in connection to the mechanism by which some amphibians and reptiles change the color of their skin. As early as 1917, Carey Pratt McCord and Floyd P. Allen discovered that feeding extract of the pineal glands of cows lightened tadpole skin by contracting the dark epidermal melanophores.

In 1958, dermatology professor Aaron B. Lerner and colleagues at Yale University, in the hope that a substance from the pineal might be useful in treating skin diseases, isolated the hormone from bovine pineal gland extracts and named it melatonin. In the mid-70s Lynch et al. demonstrated that the production of melatonin exhibits a circadian rhythm in human pineal glands.

Etymology 
When Lerner and colleagues discovered melatonin, their paper in the Journal of the American Chemical Society reads:We wish to report isolation from beef pineal glands of the active factor that can lighten skin color and inhibit MSH. It is suggested that this substance be called melatonin.The name was derived from the Greek words melas meaning "black" or "dark", and tonos meaning "labour" or "colour" or "suppress". It follows the naming style of another skin-whitening agent, serotonin, with which Lerner and colleagues compared the effects. Serotonin was discovered in 1948 as a modulator of vascular tone (serum vasoconstrictor); hence, the name. Melatonin was named likewise as it prevented darkening of the skin.

Occurrence

Animals
In vertebrates, melatonin is produced in darkness, thus usually at night, by the pineal gland, a small endocrine gland
located in the center of the brain but outside the blood–brain barrier. Light/dark information reaches the suprachiasmatic nuclei  from retinal photosensitive ganglion cells of the eyes rather than the melatonin signal (as was once postulated). Known as "the hormone of darkness", the onset of melatonin at dusk promotes activity in nocturnal (night-active) animals and sleep in diurnal ones including humans.

Many animals use the variation in duration of melatonin production each day as a seasonal clock. In animals including humans, the profile of melatonin synthesis and secretion is affected by the variable duration of night in summer as compared to winter. The change in duration of secretion thus serves as a biological signal for the organization of daylength-dependent (photoperiodic) seasonal functions such as reproduction, behavior, coat growth, and camouflage coloring in seasonal animals. In seasonal breeders that do not have long gestation periods and that mate during longer daylight hours, the melatonin signal controls the seasonal variation in their sexual physiology, and similar physiological effects can be induced by exogenous melatonin in animals including mynah birds and hamsters. Melatonin can suppress libido by inhibiting secretion of luteinizing hormone  and follicle-stimulating hormone  from the anterior pituitary gland, especially in mammals that have a breeding season when daylight hours are long. The reproduction of long-day breeders is repressed by melatonin and the reproduction of short-day breeders is stimulated by melatonin.

During the night, melatonin regulates leptin, lowering its levels.

Cetaceans have lost all the genes for melatonin synthesis as well as those for melatonin receptors. This is thought to be related to their unihemispheric sleep pattern (one brain hemisphere at a time). Similar trends have been found in sirenians.

Plants
Until its identification in plants in 1987, melatonin was for decades thought to be primarily an animal neurohormone. When melatonin was identified in coffee extracts in the 1970s, it was believed to be a byproduct of the extraction process. Subsequently, however, melatonin has been found in all plants that have been investigated. It is present in all the different parts of plants, including leaves, stems, roots, fruits, and seeds, in varying proportions. Melatonin concentrations differ not only among plant species, but also between varieties of the same species depending on the agronomic growing conditions, varying from picograms to several micrograms per gram. Notably high melatonin concentrations have been measured in popular beverages such as coffee, tea, wine, and beer, and crops including corn, rice, wheat, barley, and oats. In some common foods and beverages, including coffee and walnuts, the concentration of melatonin has been estimated or measured to be sufficiently high to raise the blood level of melatonin above daytime baseline values.

Although a role for melatonin as a plant hormone has not been clearly established, its involvement in processes such as growth and photosynthesis is well established. Only limited evidence of endogenous circadian rhythms in melatonin levels has been demonstrated in some plant species and no membrane-bound receptors analogous to those known in animals have been described. Rather, melatonin performs important roles in plants as a growth regulator, as well as environmental stress protector. It is synthesized in plants when they are exposed to both biological stresses, for example, fungal infection, and nonbiological stresses such as extremes of temperature, toxins, increased soil salinity, drought, etc.

Herbicide-induced oxidative stress has been experimentally mitigated in vivo in a high-melatonin transgenic rice.

Fungal disease resistance is another role. Added melatonin increases resistance in Malus prunifolia against Diplocarpon mali. Also acts as a growth inhibitor on fungal pathogens including Alternaria, Botrytis, and Fusarium spp. Decreases the speed of infection. As a seed treatment, protects Lupinus albus from fungi. Dramatically slows Pseudomonas syringae tomato DC3000 infecting Arabidopsis thaliana and infecting Nicotiana benthamiana.

Fungi
Melatonin has been observed to reduce stress tolerance in Phytophthora infestans in plant-pathogen systems. Danish pharmaceutical company Novo Nordisk have used genetically-modified yeast (Saccharomyces cerevisiae) to produce melatonin.

Bacteria 
Melatonin is produced by α-proteobacteria and photosynthetic cyanobacteria. There is no report of its occurrence in archaea which indicates that melanin originated in bacteria most likely to prevent the first cells from the damaging effects of oxygen in the promitive Earth's atmosphere.

Novo Nordisk have used genetically-modified Escherichia coli to produce melatonin.

Food products 
Naturally-occurring melatonin has been reported in foods including tart cherries to about 0.17–13.46 ng/g, bananas, plums, grapes, rice, cereals, herbs, olive oil, wine, and beer. The consumption of milk and sour cherries may improve sleep quality. When birds ingest melatonin-rich plant feed, such as rice, the melatonin binds to melatonin receptors in their brains. When humans consume foods rich in melatonin, such as banana, pineapple, and orange, the blood levels of melatonin increase significantly.

References

External links

 
 

 
Acetamides
Antioxidants
Aromatase inhibitors
Circadian rhythm
Hormones of the pineal gland
Melatonin receptor agonists
Methoxy compounds
Mexamines
Tryptamine alkaloids
Wikipedia medicine articles ready to translate